= Mathiasberg =

Hill in Brandenburg, Germany

Coordinates: 52°40′05″N 13°09′11″E

Geography
- Location: Brandenburg, Germany

Mathiasberg is a hill of Brandenburg, Germany.
